Cornelia Breitenbach (July 28, 1948 – October 27, 1984) was an American textile artist.

Early life
Breitenbach emigrated to the United States with her family in 1957. She studied at the Philadelphia College of Art, earning a bachelor of fine arts degree with honors in printmaking in 1970. In 1974 she received a master of fine arts degree in textile design from the Cranbrook Academy of Art in Bloomfield Hills, Michigan.

Career
Breitenbach was appointed an assistant professor of art at the University of California, Los Angeles in 1980. She died in 1984 in Beverly Hills, California. 

Her work is included in the collections of the Smithsonian American Art Museum and the National  Gallery of Art, Washington.

References

1948 births
1984 deaths
Artists from Munich
Cranbrook Academy of Art alumni
20th-century textile artists
20th-century American women artists